Millwood is an unincorporated community in Leavenworth County, Kansas, United States.  It is part of the Kansas City metropolitan area.

History
A post office was opened in Millwood in 1871, and remained in operation until it was discontinued in 1904.

References

Further reading

External links
 Leavenworth County maps: Current, Historic, KDOT

Unincorporated communities in Leavenworth County, Kansas
Unincorporated communities in Kansas